The Yellow Ribbon Singapore, formerly the Singapore Corporation of Rehabilitative Enterprises (SCORE), is a statutory board under the Ministry of Home Affairs established on 1 April 1976.

It is part of the Singapore correctional system and is a strategic partner of the Singapore Prison Service. It is in charge of enhancing the employability of offenders and preparing them for their reintegration into the national workforce. Their services include training, work, employment assistance for offenders and community engagement.

History 
Yellow Ribbon's origins date back to 7 November 1975, when it was established under the provisions of the SCORE Act, as a statutory board to bring about the rehabilitation of offenders. It took over the functions of the prison industries, which were then operating traditional services like book-binding, woodwork, cane work, tailoring and footwear manufacturing.

Activities 

Yellow Ribbon claim to provide on-the-job training to offenders in market-relevant commercial services such as laundry and linen leasing, central kitchen, bakery, food catering, subcontracting, industrial space leasing and digital media. Revenue generated from these services goes back to funding rehabilitation programmes for offenders such as training and employment assistance. It offers nationally accredited training to offenders. Apart from purely vocational training, SCORE has now included employability skills, such as IT and job readiness preparation training. It also makes use of an online job portal to facilitate the job matching of offenders with potential employers in its job bank.

Yellow Ribbon is part of the Community Action for the Rehabilitation of Ex-offenders (CARE) network, which spearheaded the Yellow Ribbon Project in 2004 to raise awareness on the reintegration needs of ex-offenders and their families.

References

External links 
 

Statutory boards of the Singapore Government